Frederick Alexander Robertson (October 22, 1911 – September 16, 1997) was a British-born Canadian professional ice hockey player who played 28 games in the National Hockey League with the Toronto Maple Leafs and Detroit Red Wings between 1932 and 1934. He won the Stanley Cup in 1932 with Toronto. The rest of his career, which lasted from 1929 to 1947, was mainly spent in the International American Hockey League/American Hockey League. He briefly served as head coach for John Carroll while playing for the Cleveland Barons. Robertson was born in the United Kingdom and moved to Canada at a young age, growing up in Toronto.

Career statistics

Regular season and playoffs

See also
 List of National Hockey League players from the United Kingdom

External links
 

1911 births
1997 deaths
British emigrants to Canada
Canadian expatriate ice hockey players in the United States
Cleveland Barons (1937–1973) players
Cleveland Falcons players
Detroit Olympics (IHL) players
Detroit Red Wings players
English ice hockey players
Hershey Bears players
Ontario Hockey Association Senior A League (1890–1979) players
Pittsburgh Hornets players
St. Louis Flyers players
Ice hockey people from Toronto
Stanley Cup champions
Syracuse Stars (IHL) players
Toronto Maple Leafs players